Wendy Ann Taylor  (born Stamford, Lincolnshire, 1945) is an English artist and sculptor, specialising in permanent, site-specific commissions. According to her website, she 'was one of the first artists of her generation to “take art out of the galleries and onto the streets”'. Her work typically consists of large sculptures which are displayed to appear carefully balanced.

Early life and education 
Wendy Taylor studied from 1963 to 1967 at the Saint Martin's School of Art in London. She gained renown for her many sculptures in the public realm, especially in London.

Career 

Taylor's abstract sculptures explore themes of equilibrium, materiality and fabrication. She views her artworks as communicative devices. 

From 1981 to 1999, Taylor was a Member of the Royal Fine Art Commission which now forms part of the Design Council. From 1986 to 1988, she was design consultant for the Commission for New Towns. In 1988, Taylor was the subject of a  documentary on The South Bank Show, and, in 1992, her work was profiled in a monograph by Edward Lucie-Smith.

In the 1988 Birthday Honours, Taylor was appointed a Commander of the Order of the British Empire. In 1999, she restored the Virginia Quay Settlers Monument at Blackwall, London, adding a mariner's astrolabe. In 2005, a major exhibition of her work was held at the Cass Sculpture Foundation in Goodwood titled The Seed Series. In 2009, this exhibition travelled to Canary Wharf in London.

Three of her works are Grade II listed structures: the Virginia Quay Settlers Monument, Timepiece in St Katharine Docks, London, and the Octo sculpture and reflecting pool, in Milton Keynes. The Octo is a "continuous strip of stainless steel, 12ft high, forms a sinuous foil to the Miesian purism of Stuart Mosscrop's town office buildings". It is an early example of the Milton Keynes Development Corporation’s public art programme.

Taylor lives and works in London. She is a fellow of the Royal Zoological Society.

The Time Party dispute 
In 2019 Taylor was in dispute with The Time Party after the minor pro-Brexit party used an image of Timepiece on their website and on their merchandise. Talking to The Observer, Taylor said "It is not so much about the politics for me, it is about using Timepiece in a way I did not intend. The Time party may say that the image is just a sundial, but it is clearly based on my work.”

Exhibitions 
 Kasmin Gallery, 1966.
 Exhibited Tier and Column at the British Council exhibition 'British Printmakers 1968–1970'.
 Sculpture 66, AIA Gallery, London 1966.
Axiom Gallery, London, 1970.
Angela Flowers Gallery, London, 1972.
24th King's Lynn Festival, Norfolk, 1974.
World Trade Centre, London, 1974.
Annely Juda Fine Art, London, 1975.
Oxford Gallery, Oxford, 1976.
Oliver Downing Gallery, Dublin, 1976.
Oliver Downing Gallery, Dublin, 1979.
'Building Art- The Process', The Building Centre Gallery, London, 1986.
Austin, Desmond & Phipps, London, 1992.
'Art and Engineering', The Osbourne Group, London, 1998.
'The Seed Series', Cass Sculpture Foundation Gallery, London, 2005.
'The Seed Series', Canary Wharf, London, 2009.

Works 

 1971: Triad, Somerville College, Oxford
 1973: Timepiece, St Katharine Docks, London
 1979/80: Octo, Norfolk House, Milton Keynes
 1982: Essence, Saxon Court, Milton Keynes
 1983: Gazebo, Golders Hill Park, London Barnet
 1986: Pharos, East Kilbride South Lanarkshire
 1987: Docklands Enterprise, West Dock/Marsh Lane
 1987: Globe Sundial Sculpture, Marine Walk, Swansea
 1994: Jester, Emmanuel College, Cambridge, and the Donald M. Kendall Sculpture Gardens, Purchase, USA
 1997: Rope Circle, Hermitage Basin, London
 1997: Spirit of Barrow
 1999: Dung Beetles, Millennium Conservation Centre, Regent's Park, London
 1999: Virginia Quay Settlers Monument, Jamestown Way, London (restoration of the 1928 monument)
 2000: Tortoises with Triangle and Time, Holland Park, London
 2000: The Millennium Fountain, River Walk, Enfield
 2001: Voyager, Wapping High Street
 2003: Knowledge, Library Square, Queen Mary and Westfield College, London
 2006: Sycamore, sculpture garden at Cass Sculpture Foundation, Goodwood

Awards

References

External links 

 Wendy Taylor's webpage
 The artist's page at Cass Sculpture Foundation

English women sculptors
Officers of the Order of the British Empire
Living people
1945 births
People from Stamford, Lincolnshire
21st-century British women artists
21st-century English women
21st-century English people